Hartmut Bagger (born 17 July 1938) is a retired German general. He served as Chief of Staff of the German Army from 1994 to 1996 and Chief of Staff of the German armed forces, the Bundeswehr, from 1996 to 1999.

Biography 

Bagger was born in Braunsberg, East Prussia (today Braniewo, Poland) and fled the advancing Red Army at the end of World War II to Celle. After passing his Abitur Bagger volunteered the Bundeswehr in 1958 as a Panzergrenadier. In 1960 he was promoted to a lieutenant at the Panzergrenadierbataillon 82 in Lüneburg.

Bagger passed his general staff training at the Führungsakademie der Bundeswehr in 1969 - 1971, promoted to a Major he served at the Panzerbrigade 18, (Neumünster) and became a lecturer of Military policy at the Führungsakademie. He completed a course at the Armed Forces Staff College, Norfolk, Virginia.

In 1976 - 1978 Bagger commanded the Panzergrenadierbataillon 51 in Rotenburg an der Fulda and served at the Bundesministerium der Verteidigung until 1980. From April 1980 till September 1982 Bagger, now an Oberst, was the Chief of staff of the 3. Panzerdivision and afterwards head of the branch "Security policy" at the Hamburg Führungsakademie, from October 1984 till April 1988 he commanded the Panzergrenadierbrigade 7 (Hamburg).

Bagger was promoted a Brigadegeneral in 1988 and served as the Chief of Staff at the III. Korps (Koblenz) until 22 November 1990 and commander of the 12. Panzerdivision (Veitshöchheim) until March 1992.

He became the deputy Inspekteur des Heeres (Chief of Staff of the German Army) on 1 April 1992 and Inspekteur des Heeres on 21 March 1994. After general Klaus Naumann became Chairman of the NATO Military Committee Bagger followed him as the Chief of Staff of the Bundeswehr on 8 February 1996, a post he held till his retirement on 31 March 1999.

Bagger lives at Meckenheim (Rheinland), is married and has two sons. One of them is the diplomat Thomas Bagger.

References 

1938 births
Living people
People from Braniewo
People from East Prussia
Bundeswehr generals
Commanders Crosses of the Order of Merit of the Federal Republic of Germany
Inspectors General of the Bundeswehr
Generals of the German Army